AWE Limited (AWE) is an oil and gas producer with proven resources in Australia, Indonesia and New Zealand. Since May 2018, it has been a wholly owned subsidiary of Mitsui & Co., Ltd. (Japan) and has been delisted from the ASX.  Mitsui E&P Australia Pty Ltd and AWE Limited are now sister companies working under the single brand of Mitsui E&P Australia (MEPAU) to reflect the combined businesses.

The company's assets currently include the BassGas project in Bass Strait, Tasmania, the Casino gas project in Otway Basin, Victoria, and onshore Perth Basin interests in Western Australia.

Corporate history
From January 2000 to November 2009, the official company name was Australia Worldwide Exploration Ltd.

In early 2001 AWE acquired 44.5% of the undeveloped Yolla field in Bass Strait.

In mid 2003, AWE acquired a 25% interest in VIC/P44. Transaction included the Casino gas field which was brought into production in  2006.

Tui Area, acquired in 2006,  started oil production on July 30, 2007. In December 2013 company purchased an additional 15% interest in the Tui area oil project.

In 2006 AWE opened an office in Indonesia to review exploration and potential development opportunities. AWE's first drill in the Bulu basin took place in early 2008. In early 2012, AWE  purchased a 100% interest and operatorship of two Indonesian Production Sharing Contracts:  Ande Ande Lumut (AAL) oil field and the Anambas gas.

In August 2008 company merged with ARC Energy gaining additional equity in the BassGas and Cliff Head projects.

AWE Limited (AWE) was created on 25 November 2009.

On Thursday (December 22, 2016), AWE Limited stated that the performance of Stage 1A of Waitsia gas project surpass pre-production expectations.

AWE is now a wholly owned subsidiary of Mitsui & Co., Ltd and has been delisted from the ASX.

References

5.

External links

Google Finance Article

Oil companies of Australia
Companies based in Sydney
Oil and gas companies of New Zealand